Athrips patockai is a moth of the family Gelechiidae. It is found in Slovakia, Slovenia, Romania, Ukraine and Russia.

The larvae feed on Spiraea media between spun leaves.

References

Moths described in 1979
Athrips
Moths of Asia